The fifth election to the Neath Port Talbot County Borough Council was held on 3 May 2012.  It was preceded by the 2008 election and will be followed by the 2017 election.  On the same day there were elections to the other 21 local authorities in Wales and community councils in Wales.

Overview
All council seats were up for election. These were the fifth elections held following local government reorganisation. Labour retained its majority. There was a significant fall in the turnout in many wards and this appears to have worked to Labour's advantage in several instances.

|}

Candidates
The number of candidates increased compared with 1999.

Results

Aberavon (three seats)

Aberdulais (one seat)

Alltwen (one seat)

Baglan (three seats)
Tallamy was elected as a Ratepayer in 2008

Blaengwrach (one seat)

Briton Ferry East (one seat)

Briton Ferry West (one seat)

Bryn and Cwmavon (three seats)

Bryncoch North (one seat)

Bryncoch South (two seats)

Cadoxton (one seat)

Cimla (two seats)
John Warman joined Labour since 2008.

Coedffranc Central (two seats)

Coedffranc North (one seat)

Coedffranc West (one seat)

Crynant (one seat)

Cwmllynfell (one seat)

Cymmer (one seat)

Dyffryn (one seat)

Glyncorrwg  (one seat)

Glynneath (two seats)

Godre'r Graig (one seat)

Gwaun Cae Gurwen (one seat)

Gwynfi (one seat)

Lower Brynamman (one seat)

Margam (one seat)

Neath East (three seats)

Neath North (two seats)

Neath South (two seats)

Onllwyn (one seat)

Pelenna (one seat)

Pontardawe (two seats)

Port Talbot (three seats)
Keogh and Tutton were elected as Ratepayers in 2008.

Resolven (one seat)

Rhos (one seat)

Sandfields East (three seats)

Sandfields West (three seats)
Olga Jones and Len Willis were deselected and stood as Independents (Willis in a neighboring ward).

Seven Sisters (one seat)

Taibach (two seats)

Tonna (one seat)

Trebanos (one seat)

Ystalyfera (one seat)

By-elections 2012-17

Neath South by-election, 2012
A by-election took place in the Neath South ward on 6 December 2012.

Sandfields East by-election, 2013
A by-election took place in the Sandfields East ward on 30 October 2014, following the death of Colin Crowley.

Sandfields East by-election, 2014
A further by-election took place in the Sandfields East ward on 30 October 2014, following the death of Mike Davies.

Cwmllynfell by-election 2015
A by-election took place in the Cwmllynfell ward on 7 May 2015 following the death of Clifford Richards.

References

Neath Port Talbot
2012